Marlon Ricardo Sierra Zamora (born 21 September 1994) is a Colombian footballer who currently plays as a midfielder for Jaguares de Córdoba.

Career statistics

Club

Notes

References

1994 births
Living people
Colombian footballers
Colombian expatriate footballers
Association football midfielders
Categoría Primera B players
Ascenso MX players
Llaneros F.C. players
Club Celaya footballers
Jaguares de Córdoba footballers
Expatriate footballers in Mexico
Colombian expatriate sportspeople in Mexico
People from Meta Department